Edward "Pete" Cleveland Aldridge Jr. (born August 18, 1938) is an aerospace engineer and former government official in the U.S. Defense Department. He was also selected as a payload specialist for the Space Shuttle mission STS-62-A, scheduled to launch in July 1986. The mission was canceled after the Space Shuttle Challenger disaster in January 1986, and Aldridge never flew.

At the Department of Defense in the 1980s, Aldridge served as the Under Secretary of the Air Force from 1981 to 1986, Director of the National Reconnaissance Office 1981–1988, and the Secretary of the Air Force from 1986 to 1988. Under President George W. Bush, he was the Under Secretary of Defense for Acquisition, Technology and Logistics from 2001 to 2003.

From 1989 to 1992 he was president of the Electronic Systems Company division of McDonnell Douglas, and later, CEO of The Aerospace Corporation.

Early life and education
Edward Cleveland Aldridge Jr. was born in Houston, Texas, the son of Lillie Idell (Née Radford) and Edward Cleveland Aldridge. Aldridge received a Bachelor of Science in aeronautical engineering from Texas A&M University in 1960 and a Master of Science from the Georgia Institute of Technology.

Career
Aldridge played a key role in the late stages of the U.S.'s Cold War with the Union of Soviet Socialist Republics (USSR) by ensuring continued U.S. military access to space. From 1981 to 1988, he served as Director of the National Reconnaissance Office—the U.S. Government agency in charge of designing, building, launching, and maintaining America’s intelligence satellites. Uncomfortable with the U.S.'s sole dependence during that time on the Space Shuttle for launch of heavy systems, he initiated a second launcher, the Titan IV, from Martin Marietta with an order for 10 vehicles in 1985. When the Space Shuttle Challenger exploded during its launch the following year, the U.S. military was able to continue its assured access to space despite the Space Shuttle's two year grounding.

Aldridge was confirmed as the Pentagon's top weapons buyer on May 8, 2001. As the Under Secretary of Defense for Acquisition, Technology and Logistics, he had responsibility for acquisition, research and development, logistics, advanced technology, international programs, environmental security, nuclear, chemical, and biological programs, and the industrial base.

In 2002, during his time as Under Secretary of Defense for Acquisition, Technology and Logistics, he authorized the acquisition of the F-35's before critical developmental testing was finished and stated the F-35 was "setting new standards for technological advances" and "rewriting the books on acquisition and business practices."  His successor voiced a different opinion in 2012. "This will make a headline if I say it, but I'm going to say it anyway," Frank Kendall said. "Putting the F-35 into production years before the first test flight was acquisition malpractice. It should not have been done." As of 2012, the military has spent $373 million to fix planes already bought; the ultimate repair bill for imperfect planes has been estimated at close to $8 billion.

He served in a variety of jobs, including:
 Secretary of the Air Force
President of McDonnell Douglass Electronic Systems Company
President and CEO of The Aerospace Corporation
Adviser to the Strategic Arms Limitation Talks in Helsinki and Vienna
 Senior manager with the LTV Aerospace Corp.,
 Senior management associate in the U.S. Office of Management and Budget
 Deputy Assistant Defense Secretary for Strategic Programs
 Vice President of National Policy and Strategic Systems Group for the System Planning Corporation
 Air Force Undersecretary for guiding and supervising the National Reconnaissance Office and the Air Force space program

Affiliations
Affiliations included:
 President and Fellow of the American Institute of Aeronautics and Astronautics
 Member, Defense Science Board
 Member, National Academy of Engineering 
 National director, Air Force Association
 Member of the board of directors of the United States Air Force Academy Foundation

Awards

 Department of Defense Distinguished Civilian Service Award
 Secretary of Defense Meritorious Civilian Service Award
 Department of Defense Distinguished Public Service Award

In 2005, Aldridge received the General James E. Hill Lifetime Space Achievement Award, by the Space Foundation. The award is in recognition for individuals who have made substantial contributions to space technology, information, themes, or resources.

References

External links

 Spacefacts biography of Edward C. Aldridge Jr.
 www.dau.mil
 

United States Secretaries of the Air Force
1938 births
Living people
Texas A&M University alumni
Georgia Tech alumni
C. E. Byrd High School alumni
Directors of the National Reconnaissance Office
George W. Bush administration personnel
Texas Republicans
American nonprofit chief executives
United States Under Secretaries of Defense
Reagan administration personnel